Vladimir Aleksandrovich Loginovsky (born 8 October 1985) is a Kazakh football player who last played for Atyrau in the Kazakhstan Premier League.

Career

Club
After leaving Atyrau during the summer of 2019, Loginovsky re-signed for Atyrau in January 2020.

International
He first appeared for the Kazakhstan national team in 2011.

Career statistics

International

Statistics accurate as of match played 29 February 2012

References

External links

1985 births
Living people
Kazakhstani people of Russian descent
Kazakhstani footballers
Kazakhstan international footballers
Kazakhstan Premier League players
FC Kyzylzhar players
FC Zhetysu players
FC Astana players
FC Tobol players
Association football goalkeepers
People from Petropavl